The Kelly Gang is an Australian feature-length film about the Australian bush ranger, Ned Kelly. The film was released in 1920, and is the second film to be based on the life of Ned Kelly, the first being The Story of the Kelly Gang, released in 1906.

Cast
 Godfrey Cass as Ned Kelly
 Victor Upton-Brown as Dan Kelly
 Horace Crawford as Joe Byrne
 Jack McGowan as Steve Hart
 Robert Inman as Aaron Sherritt
 Thomas Sinclair as Sergeant Kennedy
 Harry Southwell as Sergeant Steele
 Cyril Mackay as Constable McIntyre
 Adele Inman as Kate Kelly
 Maud Appleton as Mrs Kelly
 Frank Tomlin as Constable Scanlon

Adele and Maud were daughters of actor F. C. Appleton. Robert Inman was married to Adele.

Production
Filming took place in late 1919 in a temporary studio in the Melbourne suburb of Coburg with additional scenes shot on the outskirts of Melbourne at Croydon and Warburton.  Cameron's store in Kilsyth was used for the bank in Euroa.

Release
At the time the New South Wales government had banned films on bushranging but this movie escaped it, most likely due to its opening warning against breaking the law. The movie was reasonably successful.

Other Ned Kelly films 
 The Story of the Kelly Gang (1906)
 When the Kellys Were Out (1923)
 When the Kellys Rode (1934)
 A Message to Kelly (1947)
 The Glenrowan Affair (1951)
 Stringybark Massacre (1967)
 Ned Kelly (1970)
 Reckless Kelly (1993)
 Ned Kelly (2003)
 Ned (2003)
 True History of the Kelly Gang (2019)

References

External links
 The Kelly Gang at the National Film and Sound Archive
 
 Variety review

1920 films
1920 Western (genre) films
Australian black-and-white films
Australian historical films
Bushranger films
Cultural depictions of Ned Kelly
Silent Australian Western (genre) films
Films directed by Harry Southwell
1920s English-language films